Kayamozhi is a village 9 km west of Thiruchendur in Thoothukudi district, Tamil Nadu, India. Its history goes back to the 16th century as the capital of the old Vadapattu region.

Civics

Administration 
Civic Status : Village Panchayat
Administrative offices : Kayamozhi Panchayat Office & VAO Office.
Administration Officials : The VAO, The Village Panchayat Head & The Secretary.

Demographics 
The total population of Kayamozhi is 5497, of which male constitute 2,552 and female 2,945. Literacy rate is 85%.

Sociality 
Religion

Caste

 Kayamozhi contains all type of community people such as OBC (Aditanars, Nadars, Devars, Maruthuvars),  SC (Paraiyars, Arunthathiyars) along with some Nomadic tribes. In which, 30 - 40℅ of population is occupied by scheduled caste people.
 Even though people's classified by caste, they always united together. Muppudathi amman aadi festival unite the people once in a year which is a solid evidence for the equality among people without any caste discrimination.

Geography

Name and origin
 Kayamozhi = Khaya (can not dry) + Mozhi (Language). Kayamozhi means a place in which there is no deficit of language and resources.
 Kayamozhi is originated at 8Km west of Tiruchendur, 10 km east of Udangudi and 12 km South of Kurumbur.
 Mean Sea level (MSQ) : 15m (49feet)
Boundaries :

Economy 
Kayamozhi's economy is mainly based on agriculture.

 Government Schemes
1) Mahatma Gandhi Rural empowerment

2) Clean Bharath India

Facilities and utilities

Educational institutions 
 S B Aditanar Government Higher Secondary School – Kayamozhi.
 Govindamal Aditanar Girls High Secondary School, Kayamozhi. (Temporarily Closed)
 On the other hand, 5 Primary Schools and 3 Anganwadi centers are also situated here.

Electricity 
 Kayamozhi EB office – Sadhukkai street. It is center place for electrity of kayamozhi & it's hamlets.

Finance and banking 
 Tamil Nadu Mercantile Bank, Kayamozhi
 Kayamozhi Primary Agriculture Co-operative Society
 Post offices
 Kayamozhi S.O
 Subramaniyapuram S.O

Health and welfare 
 Government Primary Healthcare Center & Hospital, Kayamozhi is situated near to the S B Aditanar School. 
 Government Boys Hostel, Kayamozhi (Behind the SB Aditanar School)
 Government Girls Hostel, Kayamozhi (Near Hospital)

Library 
There are two libraries which are located near SB Aditanar School and bazaar street respectively.

Ration shops 
 Valluvar Nagar Rationshop.
 Kumarasamy puram Rationshop.

Others 

 e Service – 1) Kayamozhi E Seva Center 2) Kayamozhi Cooperative Society
 Veterinary Care – Veterinary Hospital, Kayamozhi

Landmarks 

Kayamozhi Red Sand Desert on the West

Temples 

Arulmigu Muppudathi Amman Temple, Kayamozhi.

Tourist Spots 

  Shows presence of pond, Beach.

Notabilities 
Notable Persons

1) S.B Aditanar

2) Sivanthi Aditanar - Founder of the Daily Thanthi news.

Notable Incidents

 Actor Surya's Singam (2010) and Actor Vijay's Villu (2009) movie scenes are shot here. Actor Dhanush's Asuran (2019) movie scenes and Actor Vishal's Thaambirabharani (2007) movie scenes are also shot here.
 SB Aditanar Statue & P.Ramachandra Aditanar Memorial Hall inauguration.

References 

Villages in Thoothukudi district
Former capital cities in India